Tim Campbell (born 27 September 1975) is an Australian television and stage actor and singer, best known for playing the character of Dan Baker in the soap opera Home and Away between 2004 and 2008. In 2007, he came third in series 6 of Dancing with the Stars.

Career

Television
In 1993, Campbell appeared in two episodes of Home and Away as Brad. Throughout the 1990s, Campbell appeared in episodes of Heartbreak High, Police Rescue, The Day of the Roses and Wildside. In 1999, he appeared in 13 episodes of Big Sky as Blake Wallace.
Smaller roles continued throughout the early 2000s, until 2003 where he played Constable Stubbs in the children's television series, Snobs. In 2004, Campbell was cast to play Dan Baker on Home and Away, where he appeared in 287 episodes.
Campbell was a contestant in series six of Dancing with the Stars, which premiered on 20 February 2007. He ultimately placed third. He hosted National Bingo Night as well as the first season of travel series Discover Tasmania in 2007. Also in 2007, Campbell appeared as a contestant on Deal or No Deal: Dancing with the Deals, in which he won $23,999 for a home viewer.

In 2008, Campbell hosted Million Dollar Wheel of Fortune which was short lived before replacing Joey Fatone on hosting The Singing Bee from 2008 to 2010.

In 2010, Campbell played Mr Doyle in 13 episodes of Dead Gorgeous and between 2012 and 2013, he played Tom on House Husbands. Tom, with partner Kane (Gyton Grantley), raise a child together on the show, with the pairing becoming the first gay male couple with a child to be featured on an Australian prime-time drama series. On 14 December 2013, it was announced that Campbell had been written out of the show and would not return for its third season.

Filmography

Films

TV

Theatre
 In November 2007, he played Roger in a Perth production the musical Rent.
 In January 2008, he played the lead role of Johnny O'Keefe in Shout! The Legend of The Wild One in Melbourne and then in Sydney.
 In mid 2009, he played Bobby in The Production Company's run of The Boy Friend at the State Theatre Melbourne.
 In June 2010, he played the role of Fiyero in the Sydney season of the Australian production of Wicked.
 In 2016, he played Corny Collins in the national tour of Hairspray the Arena Spectacular.
 In 2017, he played Johnny Casino in Grease the Arena Experience with Harvest Rain Theatre Company.

Music
Campbell released his debut studio album High School Disco on 4 April 2014. The album peaked at number 25 on the ARIA Charts. Campbell released his second studio album, Electrifying 80s in July 2018.

Personal life
In late 2007, rumours of Campbell dating singer Anthony Callea surfaced in the media. During an interview, Campbell confirmed that he is gay, but denied romantic involvement with Callea. However, on 11 February 2008, during an appearance on Vega 91.5's breakfast programme, Campbell acknowledged that he and Callea had now progressed to being "an item" stating that they were "very happy" together. The couple later thanked their fans for the support they were shown after their relationship was made public. On 18 August 2014, Campbell and Callea announced their engagement.

On 17 November 2014, they announced they had been married in a ceremony in New Zealand.

References

External links 
 
 

1975 births
Living people
Male actors from Sydney
Australian male soap opera actors
Australian television presenters
Australian gay actors
Australian gay musicians
Gay singers
Australian LGBT singers
20th-century Australian LGBT people
21st-century Australian LGBT people